The Qasaba of Radwan Bey is a souq and covered market in Cairo, Egypt, located directly south of the Bab Zuweila gate and just outside the historic walled city. Its construction was completed in 1650 CE. It is the only existing example of a historic covered market street in Cairo. Today it is also well known as the Street of the Tentmakers or al-Khayamiya, the last major market dedicated to the sale of decorative textiles known as khayamiya.

History and background

Patron and builder of the market: Radwan Bey 
The market was built by Radwan (or Ridwan) Bey, a Mamluk Bey who dominated the politics of Egypt from 1631 to 1656 (CE). His influence was partly based on the fact that he occupied for a remarkable 25 years the important post of amir al-hajj, the official in charge of organizing the pilgrimage to Mecca (hajj) which departed from Cairo every year.

Construction and context in the 17th century 
The market was built in the context of one of several urbanization enterprises carried out by powerful and wealthy officials in the 17th century which sought to develop the southern districts of Cairo between Bab Zuweila and the Citadel. Radwan Bey reorganized and rebuilt the district which had been formerly occupied by tanneries just outside Bab Zuweila. The area had also been occupied by various residences and a few older religious buildings (such as the Mosque of Salih Tala'i and the Mosque of al-Kurdi, both still standing today). Radwan Bey carried out a series of constructions from at least 1629 to 1647 (as recorded in waqf documents) He established not only a new covered market but also a wikala (caravanserai), a rab''' (rental apartment building), a zawiya, a sabil (public water dispensary), two minor mosques, and Radwan Bey's own palace/mansion. These various elements were more or less connected together and formed one large complex. Radwan Bay's palace was adjacent to the market and located just south of it, on the west side of the street. (Only a small part of it remains today.) The site of his mansion had also been the site of other palaces as far back as the 13th century. Directly north of the palace was located the wikala or caravanserai, also adjacent to the market.

The location of Radwan Bey's complex followed a clear logic in the economic geography of Cairo at the time. Since Fatimid times (10th century) the main commercial axis of Cairo was a street with a north–south orientation running between Bab Zuweila and Bab Futuh (the southern and northern gates of the Fatimid city, respectively). This street is known today as al-Mu'izz street but was also referred to as the qasaba ("avenue"). It had been the center of the city's commercial and economic activity since its Fatimid foundation. (The famous Khan al-Khalili, for example, is located along this axis.) South of Bab Zuweila, beyond the old Fatimid walls, the road continued south to Saliba Street (near the Mosque of Ibn Tulun) and ultimately all the way to the Qarafa or Southern Cemetery of Cairo. In the 17th century parts of this street were widened and straightened along areas of new construction. Radwan Bey's construction thus helped to extend the main commercial axis of Cairo further south beyond Bab Zuweila as the city developed in this direction.

 Status in modern times 
Over time, many of the elements of Radwan Bey's original development have disappeared or been built over, but the covered market remains relatively well-preserved and one of the most impressive remaining examples of purpose-built commercial/economic buildings in historic Cairo. Only fragments of Radwan's mansion also still remain. Restoration works were carried out on the market between 2002 and 2004 to restore the street facades.

The covered market was originally built to house shoemakers in Radwan Bey's time. Today, however, the area is popularly known as al-Khayamiya or Souq al-Khayamiya, a market dedicated to the sale of khayamiya textiles, a type of traditional decorative appliqué textile used for tentmaking.

 Architectural description 
The whole complex built by Radwan Bey extended around 150 meters along the main street. Some 50 meters or more of this street is covered by a wooden roof pierced with skylights. On both sides of the street, the ground level of the building is built in stone and features large bays or spaces for shops facing the street, while the upper level is built of wood and is supported by thick wooden corbels at regular intervals that allow it to project further over the street. These upper floors provided apartments where the artisans or others could live (a type of building referred to in documents as a rab').

Parts of Radwan's mansion also still remain at the southern end of the covered market, on the western side of the street. Here, a stone portal leads to a courtyard that once was part of the palace. Here one can see some mashrabiya (wooden screen) windows and, on the southern side, a maq'ad or second-story loggia that once overlooked the house's courtyard. Some decorative marble along the walls of the maq'ad'' still remain.

Gallery

See also 

Mahmud al-Kurdi Mosque

References 

Medieval Cairo
Ottoman architecture in Egypt
Buildings and structures in Cairo
Souqs